USS Estella (SP-537) was a United States Navy patrol vessel in commission from 1917 to 1919.

Estella was built in 1912 as a private motorboat. In 1917, the U.S. Navy acquired her for use as a section patrol vessel during World War I. She was commissioned as USS Estella (SP-537) on 24 May 1917.

Assigned to the 1st Naval District, Estella operated on patrol duties in northern New England waters for the rest of World War I and into 1919.

Estella was stricken from the Navy List on 13 June 1919 and sold in 1920.

References
 
 SP-537: Estella at Department of the Navy Naval History and Heritage Command Online Library of Selected Images: U.S. Navy Ships -- Listed by Hull Number: "SP" #s and "ID" #s -- World War I Era Patrol Vessels and other Acquired Ships and Craft numbered from SP-500 through SP-599
 NavSource Online: Section Patrol Craft Photo Archive: Estella (SP 537)

Patrol vessels of the United States Navy
World War I patrol vessels of the United States
1912 ships